Singled Out is a live album by Diesel released in 2004. It captures a collection of material performed solo/acoustic by Diesel.
The album was nominated for Best Adult Contemporary album at the ARIA Music Awards of 2004, but lost to Ways & Means by Paul Kelly.

Tracks 1-4 are "studio" tracks, recorded and mixed at Dim Sams. Tracks 5-14 are "live" tracks recorded in April and May 2004 at Cornish Arms Hotel, Peninsula Arms Hotel and The Brass Monkey.

Track listing
 "Don't Need Love" - 3:39
 "She Won't Need Words" - 3:33
 "Everybody's Talkin'" (Fred Neil) - 2:41
 "Would I Want You" (Diesel/Krista Polvere) - 2:56
 "Tip Of My Tongue" (Diesel/Danny Tate) - 5:54
 "One More Time" (Diesel/Jerry Williams) - 4:37
 "Soul Revival" - 4:42
 "15 Feet of Snow" - 5:25
 "Come Around" - 3:15
 "All Come Together" (Diesel/Guy Davies) - 4:57
 "Darling of the Universe" - 3:51
 "Come To Me" - 7:14
 "Faith & Gasoline" - 3:56
 "Cry in Shame" - 6:57

All tracks written by Diesel except where noted.

All instruments by Diesel except drums in "Everybody's Talkin'" (Lee Moloney)

Weekly charts

References

External links

Personnel

2004 albums
Liberation Records albums
Diesel (musician) albums